Shade is a 2003 American neo-noir crime thriller film directed and written by Damian Nieman and starring Stuart Townsend, Gabriel Byrne, Thandiwe Newton, Jamie Foxx, Melanie Griffith and Sylvester Stallone. The film follows a trio of grifters who attempt to set up a legendary card shark nicknamed "The Dean". The film had a limited release in the United States on May 7, 2004.

Plot
In an underground mob poker game, a man is revealed to be cheating with a hole card when the game gets robbed. He manages to defend himself as a huge gunfight breaks out, leaving all dead but him and one gangster. They get into a Mexican standoff.

Hustlers Tiffany and Charlie Miller meet up with poker player Larry Jennings as he's winning a game. They agree to a partnership to work a game with a potential profit of $20,000.  Larry meets the third member of the team, Vernon, a card mechanic who is working as a blackjack dealer. In a flashback, Vernon switches out the contents of a six deck shoe as his accomplices take the casino for $40,000. That night, as Vernon and Charlie wait for Larry, corrupt cop Scarne shakes them down. Larry arrives and agrees to team with them after seeing Vernon's skills - in the game, he will bet high on Vernon's crooked deals.

At the game, Larry gets impatient with the slow action and, on his own deal, gets over $100,000 in the pot. He loses; the money he bet belongs to a mobster named Malini, who sends his enforcers Marlo and Nate to retrieve him. They take him to the house, revealing it had been stripped bare - everyone at the game was in on the con. They then take Larry to an airport and kill him.

The man and the gangster (from the first scene) agree to cut cards for the money. The gangster cuts a King and the man cuts the Ace of spades. They reach for their guns; the man gets his first and kills the gangster, whose blood splatters on the ace. It is revealed that the story is an urban legend about Dean "The Dean" Stevens, a legendary card sharp and player. The crew talk about taking the Dean down at a game with a $250,000 buy-in and total stakes of at least $2,000,000. It is also revealed that Vernon and Tiffany had been lovers until Vernon's sudden departure as a result of a botched job. Tiffany became involved romantically with Charlie afterwards.

The next day, Malini's enforcers track down Charlie to a restaurant and Marlo demands the return of Malini's money. Charlie agrees to pay back $100,000, but Nate pulls a gun and a gunfight ensues. Tiffany arrives in time to kill Nate, but Marlo escapes. Charlie, Vernon and Tiffany escape and hide out with The Professor, Vernon's former mentor, who is suspicious of Charlie and insists Vernon is better than him. Scarne arrives at the murder scene and realizes that the three are involved from a description by the witnesses. Meanwhile, The Dean arrives and meets up with an old flame, Eve, expressing his desire to retire from playing.

The three arrive at the Hollywood Roosevelt Hotel for the game, where they discover that the host is Malini.  Vernon and the Dean bust the other players and agree to play five card stud. Eve arrives, and they take a break. The three talk about the trouble Vernon is having and Tiffany speculates the cards are marked.  Vernon discovers the Dean is using a "juice deck," a deck marked to be readable when one's eyes are unfocused.

In the final hand, Vernon mucks a card and deals the hand. He deals the Dean two pair, Kings and Queens, and himself a pair of Jacks with a 7 in the hole for the Dean to see. The Dean goes all in, and when Vernon is $50,000 short, Charlie and Tiffany make up the shortfall so he can call the bet. Before the cards are turned up, Marlo enters the room. Identifying the three as the team who conned Larry, Malini's muscle pull their guns and Tiffany pulls hers, in which Scarne enters with his gun drawn. The Dean diffuses the tense situation by insisting that the hand be completed. Vernon swaps out his hole 7 for a third Jack, which would beat the two pair he'd dealt the Dean. The room is stunned when the Dean turns up a third Queen to take the hand and win the game. Malini tells the three they can leave but gently threatens them to stay clear of the Los Angeles rackets.

Charlie splits up the partnership with Vernon and, after Marlo's revelation that he was tipped off by Tiffany about shaking down Larry, with her as well. As Vernon sits alone in a diner, The Dean, Eve and Scarne enter, revealing the game was all an elaborate setup by the four of them to con Charlie and Tiffany. They split the take, but as he leaves the Dean pauses to flip the blood-stained Ace of spades to Vernon, confirming the urban legend to be fact.

Cast

 Stuart Townsend as Vernon
 Gabriel Byrne as Charlie Miller
 Thandiwe Newton as Tiffany (credited as Thandie Newton)
 Jamie Foxx as Larry Jennings
 Melanie Griffith as Eve
 Sylvester Stallone as Dean "The Dean" Stevens
Jason Cerbone as young Dean Stevens
 Bo Hopkins as Lieutenant Scarne
 Patrick Bauchau as Max Malini
 Roger Guenveur Smith as Marlo
 B-Real as Nate
 Glenn Plummer as Gas Station Attendant
 Dina Merrill as Dina
 Hal Holbrook as Professor
 Michael Dorn as Jack Thornhill

Music
The Shade soundtrack features three original works, "Penumbra," "Moon Rocks" and "Red Reflections", composed and recorded by jazz composer and flugelhornist Dmitri Matheny.
The band The Golden Ratio, together with composer Ken Rangkuty, wrote two original works, "Licentious" and "Never", for the soundtrack.

Release

Theatrical
The film was produced by RKO Pictures in 2003 and released in the USA on 21 June 2003 at the CineVegas International Film Festival. It began its limited theatrical run on 9 April 2004.

Home media
The film was initially released on DVD and VHS by distributor DEJ Productions. It later received a widescreen release courtesy of Warner Home Video.

In December 2019, the film was released on Blu-ray for the first time by MVD Entertainment Group, as a part of their Marquee Collection.

Reception

Box office
Shade was open for only five weeks in six theaters, and it grossed $458,144 in worldwide ticket sales.

Critical response
The film holds a 67% rating at Rotten Tomatoes based on reviews from 15 critics.

References

External links 
 
 
 
 

2003 films
2003 crime thriller films
2000s heist films
American crime thriller films
American heist films
Films about con artists
Films about magic and magicians
Films scored by Christopher Young
Films about poker
Films about card games
RKO Pictures films
2003 directorial debut films
2003 independent films
2000s English-language films
2000s American films